The Sony Xperia Z5 Compact is an Android smartphone produced by Sony. Part of the Sony Xperia Z series, the device, at that point known by the project code name "Suzuran", was unveiled along with the Xperia Z5 and Xperia Z5 Premium during a press conference at IFA 2015 on September 2, 2015. The device was first launched in Taiwan on October 1, 2015, and in Japan on November 12, 2015. It is the successor of the Sony Xperia Z3 Compact. In Japan it is known as the SO-02H, exclusive to NTT Docomo.

Specifications

Hardware
The device is down-scaled version of the Xperia Z5. Unlike its predecessor, the Z5 compact features a fingerprint reader and a 23 Megapixel camera with 0.03 seconds Hybrid Autofocus that utilizes phase detection autofocus.

Software
Sony Xperia Z5 Compact ships with Android 5.1.1 Lollipop and is upgradable to Android 7.1.1 Nougat.

References

External links

 Official Press Release
 Official Website
 Official Specification

Android (operating system) devices
Discontinued flagship smartphones
Sony smartphones
Mobile phones introduced in 2015
Digital audio players
Mobile phones with 4K video recording